Tacoma Country and Golf Club is a private golf course and country club in Tacoma, Washington. Created in 1894, it had the first golf course in the Western United States not on a military reservation (the Mare Island course opened in 1892), and is the oldest continuously operating golf club in the West.

References

External links

1894 establishments in Washington (state)
Golf clubs and courses in Washington (state)